Geertsen is a common Family Name in the Netherlands.

As a result of the migration of a small Dutch community to Denmark in the 16th or 17th century, it is also in use in Denmark (where it is not to be confused with the Danish Gertsen).
The Geertsens initially settled on the island of Amager along with the rest of the Dutch emigrants. Here they farmed for the nearby Danish capital of Copenhagen, while interacting mainly with the rest of the Dutch community. Later on they spread to other parts of the country, including to the cities of Randers and Ringsted. 

In Denmark today there live about 700-800 persons with the last name Geertsen. These include politicians Pelle Christy Geertsen and Martin Geertsen. Pelle Christy Geertsen is a board member and former spokesperson of the Danish June Movement. Martin Geertsen is one of the mayors of the Danish Capital of Copenhagen. He is a member of the governing liberal party Venstre.

Surnames